DoctorOnCall is a Malaysian-based telehealth provider. It provides a platform to connect patients to doctors for virtual medical consultations via telephone, videoconferencing and text messaging. It provides access to board-certified doctors for non-emergency and non-life threatening medical issues

History
DoctorOnCall was conceived by Maran Virumandi and his ex-colleague Hazwan Najib while they were both management consultants. They worked towards launching the platform in May 2016.

Platform
The platform provides the public with a non-emergency medical consultation from a healthcare professional via the website. Customers will have an option to consult with the doctor via a video call or a phone call for a fee, and with a waiting time of five to seven minutes.

The doctor will issue a necessary medical prescription if required after the consultation ends. It provides medication delivery all around Malaysia and currently, same-day medication delivery service is available in Klang Valley and Penang island area.

References

External links
 DoctorOnCall website

2016 establishments in Malaysia
Health software
Online companies of Malaysia